William Henry Burgess Piddington (24 April 1856 – 27 September 1900) was an Australian politician and a member of the New South Wales Legislative Assembly for six years.

Birth and education
Piddington was born in Brisbane, Queensland and educated there and Newington College whilst the school was situated at Newington House on the Parramatta River. He was the first son of London-born William Jones Killick Piddington and his Tasmanian wife Annie, née Burgess. William Snr was a Methodist minister who in later life became an Anglican. Albert Piddington was a younger brother, and Ralph Piddington was his nephew.

Banking and parliament
In 1872, Piddington commenced working for the Commercial Banking Company of Sydney and he was the branch manager in Walcha, New South Wales, when he won the local Legislative Assembly seat in 1894. He resigned from the Legislative Assembly on 23 May 1900 and was made bankrupt on his own petition 2 days later. He retained the seat at the resulting by-election.

Death
He died from apoplexy whilst still a member of parliament and was survived by his wife and five children.

References

 

1856 births
1900 deaths
Members of the New South Wales Legislative Assembly
Free Trade Party politicians
Protectionist Party politicians
People educated at Newington College
19th-century Australian politicians